Per Anders Hillborg (born 31 May 1954) is one of Sweden’s leading composers.

Education
Anders Hillborg was born in Sollentuna, and studied composition, counterpoint and electronic music at the Kungliga Musikhögskolan in Stockholm from 1976 to 1982. His teachers were Gunnar Bucht, Lars-Erik Rosell, Arne Mellnäs and Pär Lindgren. An important source of inspiration was Brian Ferneyhough who was a visiting professor at the time.

Career
Apart from some minor teaching positions, professor in composition at Musikhögskolan i Malmö 1990 and masterclasses, Hillborg has been a freelance composer since 1982. His output is vast and covers genres as orchestral, choir, chamber works as well as film and popular music. An example of his work in the popular realm is his collaboration with Eva Dahlgren, which resulted in the album Jag vill se min älskade komma från det vilda (1995). The project was first presented at the Helsinki Festival with the Swedish Radio Symphony Orchestra conducted by Esa-Pekka Salonen.

His collaboration with Salonen has resulted in numerous works, among others Dreaming River (premiered by the Royal Stockholm Philharmonic Orchestra in 1999),  Eleven Gates (2005–06) premiered and commissioned by the Los Angeles Philharmonic. and most recently the large-scale work Sirens jointly commissioned by the LA Phil and Chicago Symphony Orchestra.

Other important recent works Cold Heat (2010) which was co-commissioned by the Berlin Philharmonic, the Finnish Radio Symphony Orchestra and Tonhalle Orchestra, Zürich Tonhalleorkestern. The piece premiered in 2011 at Berliner Philharmonie under David Zinman.

Selected awards 
  1991 and 1997
 International Rostrum of Composers 1992

Selected works 
Orchestral
 Clang and Fury (1985–1989)
 Cold Heat (2010)
 Dreaming River (1999)
 Eleven Gates (2005–2006)
 Exquisite Corpse (2002, 2005)
 Flood Dreams (2009)
 Himmelsmekanik (1983–1985)
 King Tide (1999)
 Liquid Marble (1995)
 Beast Sampler (2014)
 Sirens for two sopranos, mixed choir and orchestra (2011)

Concertante
 Violin Concerto No. 1 (1991–1992)
 Trombone Concerto (1993)
 Clarinet Concerto Peacock Tales (1999, 2002)
 Piano Concerto (2000)
 Concerto for 2 Trombones and Orchestra (2004)
 Percussion Concerto (2007)
 Flute Concerto (2009)
 Méditations sur Pétrarque for oboe and orchestra (2009)
 Violin Concerto No. 2 (2016)
 Cello Concerto (2020)
 Viola Concerto (2021)

Chamber music
 Musik för 10 altvioliner (Music for 10 Violas) (1987, 1993)
 Hautposaune for trombone and tape (1990)
 Tampere Raw for clarinet and piano (1991)
 Heisenbergminiatyrer for string quartet (2006–2007)

Choral
 Mouyayoum for mixed chorus (1983–1985)

References

External links
 Official webpage
 Interview with Anders Hillborg
 Anders Hillborg - Virtual International Philharmonic
 Interview with Anders Hillborg, 26 February 2005

1954 births
20th-century classical composers
21st-century classical composers
Living people
Swedish classical composers
Swedish male classical composers
International Rostrum of Composers prize-winners
20th-century Swedish male musicians
20th-century Swedish musicians
21st-century Swedish male musicians
Musikförläggarnas pris winners